The Rennsteig Cycle Path follows for 195 km the Rennsteig trail that has existed at least since the Middle Ages as a courier and trade route. Most of this long distance cycle path is carefully ballasted, although parts of it also run along quiet country lanes. On the crest of the Thuringian Highland the cycle path is identical for long stretches with the hiking trail of the same name, but departs from it in places so that steep inclines can be avoided. It starts at Hörschel west of Eisenach and ends in Blankenstein by the River Saale.

Literature 
 Rennsteig Radwanderweg, 1 : 50 000, Verlag grünes herz. 
 Radwanderkarte Rennsteig-Radwanderweg, 1 : 50 000, Publicpress-Verlag,

External links 
 http://www.rennsteig.net/radwandern/radinfo.htm
 Detailed route description of the Rennsteig Cycle Path with height and route profiles

Cycleways in Germany
Transport in Thuringia